Frederick Keppel Craven (11 April 1812 – 21 June 1864) was an English cricketer who played for Cambridge University cricket team in a first-class cricket match against the Cambridge Town XI in 1833.

Craven scored eight in his first innings, batting at the end of the batting order, before moving up to open the batting for the second innings where he failed to score. His team, however, were victorious by 92 runs.

Craven was a son of William Craven, 1st Earl of Craven (1770–1825). He was educated at Eton, then matriculated at Christ Church, Oxford, in 1830 but moved to Downing College, Cambridge, in 1832. He died in Grosvenor Square, London, in 1864.

Notes

External links
 
 

1812 births
1864 deaths
Frederick Keppel
Younger sons of earls
Cambridge University cricketers
English cricketers of 1826 to 1863
People educated at Eton College
Alumni of Christ Church, Oxford
Alumni of Downing College, Cambridge